Rifle River is a  river in the U.S. state of Michigan. It rises in northeastern Ogemaw County and flows through Arenac County to enter Saginaw Bay of Lake Huron. Once a logging river during the Michigan forestry boom at the turn of the 20th century, the river is now primarily used for recreation, and is a state-designated natural river.  It is a popular river for canoeing, with no portages or dams and an average depth of 18 inches, to 5 feet in downtown Omer. It is also known for having one of the best White Sucker (Catostomus commersonii) runs in the state of Michigan, in the spring.

Canoe liveries serving the Rifle River
Several private canoe operators provide equipment rental and transportation for river trips along the Rifle River.

Twining, Michigan
 Whispering Pines Campground and Canoe Livery.

Sterling, Michigan (Central portion of the Rifle River - Most Popular)
 Rifle River Campground & Canoe Livery
 River View Campground & Canoe Livery 
 Whites Campground & Canoe Livery

Omer, Michigan (Lower portion of the Rifle River)
 Big Bend Campground & Canoe Rental
 Riverbend Campground & Canoe Rental
 Russell's Canoe Livery

See also
Rifle River Recreation Area

References

External links

 Department of Natural Resources Rifle River Map

Rivers of Michigan
Rivers of Arenac County, Michigan
Rivers of Ogemaw County, Michigan
Tributaries of Lake Huron
Saginaw Bay